Maroua Sign Language is a sign language used by approximately 150 people in and around the town of Maroua, capital of the Far North Region of Cameroon.

References

Village sign languages
Sign languages of Cameroon